Kale Township  is a township in Kale District in the Sagaing Division of Burma (Myanmar). The principal town is Kalay.

Geography and borders
Kale Township runs north–south along the Kale Valley in which lie the south flowing Neyinzaya River and the north flowing Myittha River which meet near the administrative seat of Kalemyo and flow east toward the Chindwin River. It is bounded approximately within coordinates of 22° 36´ and 23° 38´ north latitudes and between 93° 58´ and 94° 16´ east longitudes. On the west it is bounded by the foothills of the Chin Hills and on the east by the Mwegyi Mountain Range.

Kale Township is surrounded by the townships of:
 Tonzang of Chin State and Mawlaik to the north;
 Kalewa and Mingin on the east;
 Gangaw to the south; and
 Hakha, Falam, Tiddim and Tonzang of Chin State to the west.

Towns and villages
Bogon, Bogyi, Chaunggyauk, Chaunggyin, Haka, Hmunlai, Hnawgon, Honnaing, Hpaungzeik, Htoma Myauk, Inbaung, Indainggale, Indainggyi, Indin, Ingyaw, Ingyun, Insein, Inthe, Kalemyo, Kanbale, Kangyi, Kantha, Kinmungyon, Kokko, Kondo, Kyaukka, Kyaukpyok, Kyawywa, Kyetpanet, Kyigon, Lamaing, Legyi, Manda, Mawlaik, Myogyigon, Myohla, Nanhannwe, Nankyisaung, Nansaungpu, Nanzalu, Natchaung, Nat-in, Natkyigon, Natmyaung, Natnan, Ngapa, Nwa, Okkan, Palata Sakan, Pinlon, Pyin Khone Gyi, Sanmyo, Segyi, Shabo, Sibin, Sihaung Ashe, Sihaung Myauk, Sihaung Taung, Sinywa, Siyin, Htauk Kyant, Taung-u, Thayagon, Thayettaw, Thazi, Thekondan, Udu, Uyin, Yenatha, Yeshin, Zingalaing.Kyarinn.Kyun Chaung

References

External links
 "Kale Google Satellite Map" Maplandia World Gazetteer
 "Sagaing Division (Lower), Myanmar" Myanmar Information Management Unit (MIMU), map Id: MIMU270v01, creation date: 5 Aug 2010 — map showing the township boundaries

 
Townships of Sagaing Region
Kale District